The Scottish Women's Institutes (SWI), informally called "the Rural", is a registered charity which promotes the preservation of Scotland's traditions and rural heritage, particularly in the sphere of household activities. It does so by means of local groups of women which meet regularly throughout the country.

It was formed on 26 June 1917 as the Scottish Women's Rural Institutes, part of the movement of rural women's institutes started in Stoney Creek, Ontario in 1897. The first meeting in Scotland look place at Longniddry in East Lothian. Catherine Hogg Blair had identified the need for a Scottish example of the emerging Women's Institutes movement and she organised the meeting at Longniddry to avoid a measles outbreak in her own village. 37 women became members and campaigner Nannie Brown was the area organiser. The SWRI created the chance for rural women to network and share their skills with one another.

The group's magazine, Scottish Home and Country was first published in 1924.

The name changed to Scottish Women's Institutes in 2015.

References

External links
 

1917 establishments in Scotland
Charities based in Scotland
Women's organisations based in Scotland
Organizations established in 1917
Scottish traditions
Rural Scotland
Family economics